Narcissus moschatus, the swan's neck daffodil, is a species of Narcissus native to the Pyrenees. It has gained the Royal Horticultural Society's Award of Garden Merit.

Some authorities regard Narcissus moschatus as a synonym for Narcissus pseudonarcissus subsp. moschatus .

References

moschatus
Garden plants of Europe
Taxa named by Carl Linnaeus
Plants described in 1762